The First Republic of Armenia was the first independent Armenian state since the Cilician Kingdom of Armenia, proclaimed on 28 May 1918 in the territory of present Armenia. The republic lasted until 2 December 1920 when it was partitioned by the Russian SFSR and the Turkish Nationalist forces. In the two and a half years of its existence, the republic was composed of 9 mostly Dashnak-dominated cabinets.

First Cabinet 
(30 June 1918 - 4 November 1918)

After weeks of negotiations, the Armenian National Council sent Hovhannes Kachaznuni to Yerevan to form the first Armenian cabinet on an "individual basis":

Second Cabinet 
(4 November 1918 - Spring 1919)

Populist Kristapor Vermishian replaced Levon Ghulian as Minister of Provisions on 1 March 1919. In March, 1919, Colonel Christophor Araratov was promoted to a major general, becoming the Minister of Military Affairs:

Third Cabinet 
(Spring 1919 - 28 May 1919)

The third cabinet was as follows:

Fourth Cabinet 
(28 May 1919 - 10 August 1919)

Khatisian formed an interim cabinet before the coming election after the Populists boycotted the Dashnaks; Harutiun Chmshkian left the Populists to remain in the cabinet:

Fifth Cabinet 
(10 August 1919 - Spring 1920)

The 1919 Armenian parliamentary election gave the Dashnaks a "sweeping majority in the legislature":

Sixth Cabinet 
(February 1920 - 5 April 1920)

Most ministries were reorganised in preparation for a campaign of national reconstruction:

Seventh Cabinet 
(5 April 1920 - 5 May 1920)

For the first time since the first cabinet, Dashnaks held all the posts:

Eighth Cabinet 
(5 May 1920 - 25 November 1920)

Following the chaos of the May Uprising, Alexander Khatisian resigned from the cabinet, leading to a formation of a new government under Hamo Ohandjanian:

Ninth Cabinet 
(25 November 1920 - 2 December 1920)

As the Turkish-Armenian War progressed unfavourably for the Republic of Armenia, the government of Hamo Ohandjanian resigned, leading to Simon Vratsian forming the last cabinet of Armenia before its partition:

Gallery

References

Bibliography 

First Republic of Armenia
Armenian nationalism
Modern history of Armenia
1918 in Armenia
1919 in Armenia
1920 in Armenia